The Three Stars mansion is one of the twenty-eight mansions of the Chinese constellations.  It is one of the western mansions of the White Tiger. This collection of seven bright stars is visible during winter in the Northern Hemisphere (summer in the Southern).

Asterisms

References

Chinese constellations